Artemisia verlotiorum, the Chinese mugwort, is a species of plant in the sunflower family, widespread across much of Eurasia.

Etymology
It is named for Jean Baptiste Verlot, who first distinguished the plant from Artemisia vulgaris in 1877 and for his brother Pierre Bernard Verlot, and is sometimes referred to as Verlot's Mugwort.

Description
It has oblong reddish to brown capitula, its stems are green and the leaves broader, lighter colored and denser on the stem. The plant is more strongly and pleasantly aromatic than Artemisia vulgaris. It flowers very late in the summer, but reproduces mainly by stolons, thus forming thick groups. Chinese Mugwort shares the same habitat as Artemisia vulgaris, and both are very common.

Artemisia verlotiorum is often confused with Artemisia vulgaris ("common mugwort"), which is closely related.

References

External links

verlotiorum
Flora of Asia
Flora of Europe
Plants described in 1877